Good and Naughty is a 1926 American silent romantic comedy film directed by Malcolm St. Clair and starring Pola Negri and Tom Moore. It was based on the play Naughty Cinderella by Henri Falk and René Peter. Released in 1926, it is a romantic comedy of mistaken identity about an attractive interior decorator (Negri) who is forced to make herself unattractive so she can be hired by a firm that has a policy against hiring attractive women.

Cast

Preservation
With no prints of Good and Naughty located in any film archives, it is a lost film.

References

External links

Still  at snipview.com
Still at gettyimages.com
Still at silentfilmstillarchive.com

1926 films
1926 romantic comedy films
American silent feature films
American romantic comedy films
American films based on plays
Films directed by Malcolm St. Clair
Films set in Florida
Paramount Pictures films
American black-and-white films
Lost American films
Lost romantic comedy films
1926 lost films
1920s English-language films
Silent romantic comedy films
1920s American films
Silent American comedy films